Cipla Quality Chemical Industries Limited (CiplaQCIL) is a pharmaceutical manufacturing company in Uganda. According to a 2007 published report, it was the only company in Africa that manufactured triple-combination antiretroviral (ARV) drugs. CiplaQCIL also manufactures the antimalarial drug Lumartem, containing artemisinin and lumefantrine, and the Hepatitis B generic medicines  Texavir and Zentair.

Location
CiplaQCIL's pharmaceutical manufacturing plant is located in Luzira, a neighborhood in Nakawa Division in south-eastern Kampala. The coordinates of the plant are 0°18'17.0"N, 32°38'22.0"E (Latitude:0.304723; Longitude:32.639436).

Overview
As of March 2019, the company's total assets were valued at USh287.561 billion (US$78.516 million), with shareholders' equity of USh168.310 billion (US$46 million).

History
In 2004, Quality Chemicals Limited (QCL) convinced Indian drug maker Cipla to go into a joint venture with QCL and the government of Uganda to establish a pharmaceutical plant in Uganda. Ground was broken in 2005 and the factory was commissioned in 2007, with capacity of 6 million pills daily.

In 2009, TLG Capital, a London-based private equity company, invested an undisclosed amount of money in the plant. Later, CapitalWorks Investment Partners, a private equity firm based in South Africa, also became a shareholder in the plant. In February 2010, the government of Uganda divested from the plant by selling its shares "at cost" to CiplaQCIL. The transaction was valued at US$5 million.

In February 2011, the owners of the plant announced a US$40 million expansion of the production line to include increased production of antiretroviral and antimalarial medication. In April 2012, British media reported that CiplaQCIL was in the process of expanding its manufacturing capacity fourfold. The plant had received approval of its processes and products from the World Health Organization. The products were expected to be initially marketed  in Burundi, the Democratic Republic of the Congo, Kenya, Rwanda, South Sudan, Tanzania, and Uganda.

According to a 2012 published report, a second plant is being planned to be built next to the first plant, which would raise CiplaQCIL's manufacturing capacity to 18 million pills daily.

As of April 2016, the company's products were marketed in Cameroon, Comoros, Kenya, Namibia, Tanzania, Uganda, and Zambia.

In February 2020, the factory passed the first of three stages, in qualification to supply medication to South Africa. At that time, the following countries were accepting shipments from the factory: (1) Tanzania (2) Namibia (3) Sierra Leone (4) Angola (5) Mozambique  (6) Zambia (7) Rwanda and (8) Myanmar. In March 2020 the company shipped 300,000 ARV does to South Africa. This was followed by another 150,000 doses in April 2020, to be followed by 150,000 doses every month thereafter. Rwanda, Ghana, Zimbabwe and Zambia are receiving regular shipments from CQCIL.

CQCIL began shipment of antiretroviral drugs to Botswana in June 2020. During the second quarter of 2020, pharmaceutical sales totaled US$10million (USh37 billion). Of that Uganda accounted for US$1 million (10 percent) and Botswana purchased drugs worth US$4 million (40 percent). Other African countries bought the remaining US$5 million (50 percent), worth of pharmaceuticals during the quarter.

In April 2021 the Daily Monitor Newspaper reported that CiplaQCIL had been authorized to ship antimalarials and HIV/AIDS medication to 30 new African countries in West Africa and Southern Africa. This is in addition to the elven African markets it has been shipping to since inception. This gives CiplaQCIL access to an estimated 74 percent of the African continental market.

Market segmentation
The table below illustrates the market segmentation of CiplaQCIL products for the 12 months ended 30 June 2021, valued at USh127 billion (approx. US$36.1 million).

Note: Totals are slightly off due to rounding.

Ownership of pharmaceutical plant
, the shareholding in the pharmaceutical plant was as depicted in the table below: In 2017, the company began to implement plans to list some of its shares on the Uganda Securities Exchange. After the listing it is expected that the shareholding in the company stock will be as reflected in the table below.

Cipla also owns 51 percent of Quality Chemicals Limited.
Up until May 2015 Quality Chemicals Limited owned 22.05 percent of CiplaQCIL. Sometime after that, Quality Chemicals sold their entire shareholding; 10.8 percent to three of the individual founders and the remaining 11.25 percent to Cipla European Union, thus raising Cipla's shareholding to the pre-IPO level of 62.3 percent.

Governance
The executive chairman of the board of directors of CiplaQCIL is Emmanuel Katongole, who was formerly the managing director of QCIL. He replaced Francis Kitaka, the first person in East Africa to train as a biochemist, The managing director of CiplaQCIL is Ajay Kumar Pal. He replaced Nevin Bradford who retired in 2021, after eight years with the company. John Collins Kamili is the Company Pharmacist and Executive Director at CiplaQCIL.

Valuation
In September 2018, CQCIL offloaded 18 percent shareholding to institutional and individual investors. The IPO raised US$43.8 million. This puts the valuation of shareholders equity in the company at US$243.3 million.

See also
 Kampala Capital City Authority

References

External links
 QCIL To Manufacture Special ARVs
 Museveni Opens AIDS Drugs Factory

Pharmaceutical companies of Uganda
Manufacturing companies of Uganda
Luzira
Nakawa Division
Pharmaceutical companies established in 2005
2005 establishments in Uganda
Companies based in Kampala